Karl Oole (26 January 1907 – 21 February 1961) was an Estonian weightlifter. He competed in the men's light heavyweight event at the 1936 Summer Olympics.

References

1907 births
1961 deaths
Estonian male weightlifters
Olympic weightlifters of Estonia
Weightlifters at the 1936 Summer Olympics
People from Vinni Parish
Burials at Metsakalmistu